KCAP (1340 AM) was a radio station licensed to serve Helena, Montana. The station was owned by Cherry Creek Radio and licensed to CCR-Helena IV, LLC. It aired a News/Talk format.

The station was assigned the KCAP call letters by the Federal Communications Commission (FCC). It went on the air in October 1949. On October 30, 2014, KCAP's license was surrendered by Cherry Creek Radio to the FCC, who subsequently cancelled it; the station's programming moved that November to KMTX (950 AM), which Cherry Creek Radio is in the process of acquiring from Montana Radio Company. The KCAP call sign was then transferred to KMTX.

Ownership
In August 2000, a deal was reached for KCAP to be acquired by Commonwealth Communications LLC from STARadio Corp. as part of a 9 station deal with a total reported sale price of $7.5 million.

In October 2003, a deal was reached for KCAP to be acquired by Cherry Creek Radio from Commonwealth Communications LLC as part of a 24 station deal with a total reported sale price of $41 million.

References

CAP
Defunct radio stations in the United States
Radio stations established in 1949
1949 establishments in Montana
Radio stations disestablished in 2014
2014 disestablishments in Montana
CAP